Shopping malls in Algeria include:

 Al Qods Shopping Mall, Algiers
 Bab Ezzouar Shopping Mall, Algiers

Algeria
Shopping malls